Philip D. W. Krey (born 1 May 1950) is the former President of The Lutheran Theological Seminary at Philadelphia. He was born in Brooklyn, and was ordained a minister of the Lutheran Church in America.

Krey has degrees from the University of Massachusetts Boston, the Lutheran Theological Seminary at Gettysburg, the Catholic University of America and the University of Chicago. He was also a Fulbright Fellow at the University of Munich. Krey's research interests include the history of biblical interpretation, medieval theology, and urban ministry.

Krey is the author of 10 non-fiction books and is now Pastor of St. Andrews Lutheran Church in Perkasie, PA. http://www.standrewsperkasie.org/

Non-fiction 
 For All The Saints (Rejoice) 1991
 Nicholas of Lyra's Apocalypse Commentary (Eastman Studies in Music) (1997)
 A Seminary in Mission for a Church in Mission: Reflections as a Presidency Begins (2000)
 Nicholas of Lyra: The Senses of Scripture (Studies in the History of Christian Thought) (2000)
 Hebrews (Ancient Christian Commentary on Scripture) (2005)
 Luther's Spirituality (Classics of Western Spirituality) (2007)
 The Letter to the Romans (The Bible in Medieval Tradition (BMT)) (2013)
 The Catholic Luther: His Early Writings (2016)
 Romans 9-16 (Reformation Commentary on Scripture) (2016)
 Reformation Observances: 1517-2017 (2017)

References

1950 births
Living people
People from Brooklyn
Evangelical Lutheran Church in America Christians
20th-century American Lutheran clergy
Seminary presidents
University of Massachusetts Boston alumni
Catholic University of America alumni
Heads of universities and colleges in the United States
University of Chicago alumni
Bible commentators
21st-century American Lutheran clergy